Live at the Continental Club is a live album by alternative rock band Sonic Youth, recorded at Continental Club in Austin, Texas on April 12, 1986. Many of the songs performed were from their new album (at the time) EVOL.

Track listing

"Tom Violence"
"Shadow of a Doubt"
"Starpower"
"Secret Girl"
"Death to Our Friends"
"Green Light"
"Kill Yr. Idols"
"Ghost Bitch"
"Expressway to Yr. Skull"
"World Looks Red"
"Confusion (Indeed)"
"Exit Stage-Applause"
"Outro"

References 

1992 live albums
Sonic Youth live albums